Villadhi Villain is a 1995 Indian Tamil-language action black comedy film, written and directed by Sathyaraj, starring himself in three distinct roles. Nagma and Raadhika play his love interests. The film, which was Sathyaraj's directorial debut, which remains his first and only directorial so far. The film was also his 125th starrer and 100th film in lead role, took a mammoth opening at the box office. It was dubbed in Hindi under the title Ek Aur Dharmatma and in Telugu as Sastry.

Plot 
Meenatchi Sundara Sasthiriyaar is a successful, cunning Brahmin lawyer in the city, and has never lost any case. He is known for his sheer intelligence in the court, and he is very brutal in nature, having excessive feelings for his caste. He is married to Parvathi, whom he always calls as Bombai. Also, they have a beautiful daughter named Janaki.

Edison, a man who comes from the area of Ambetkar, is a road roller driver and local who trains fighting for his locals, living with his poor and affectionate people at the slum. He is a staunch atheist and is like the leader of his group. He has trouble with the minister of that area whose name is Amsavalli. When his area is affected by a storm, he, along with his group, goes to the minister for help, but the minister badly abuses and insults their group. He and his friend Mani both get into a verbal exchange with the minister, leave the place and rebuild their huts. Angered by this, the minister orders her henchmen to beat up Edison and set the huts on fire, and the huts get burnt. As Edison reaches his anger point, he rides a bulldozer and demolishes the minister's house. Also mysteriously, she is killed, but the blame falls on Edison for driving the bulldozer on her and killing her.

In the meanwhile, previously Edison has saved both Parvathi and her daughter Janaki. Due to this, Janaki falls in love with Edison and Parvathi has a good regard for him. Upon seeing Edison's current situation, Parvathi asks her husband to be the lawyer for Edison and save him from the death sentence. Meenatchi Sundara Sasthiriyaar agrees to this. What happens next forms the rest of the story and the rest of the movie.

Cast 
 Sathyaraj as Edison/Meenatchi Sundara Sasthiriyaar/Poo (Kannan)
 Raadhika as Parvathi (Bombai Mami)
 Nagma as Janaki
 Goundamani as Mani
 Vichithra as Minister Amsavalli
 Manivannan as Minister Kuppusamy
R. Sundarrajan
 Silk Smitha
 Mayilsamy
 Bobby Bedi as local area bully
 Halwa Vasu

Soundtrack 
The music and background score was composed by Vidyasagar, with lyrics by Vairamuthu.

Reception 
RPR of Kalki criticised the film for favouring box-office ingredients like action, comedy and songs over story.

Impact 
The movie was a blockbuster hit upon release. It gained popularity for the explicit glamour scenes played by Nagma and the song "Vayaso Pathikichu" song was a famous chartbuster at that time.

References

External links 
 

1990s Tamil-language films
1995 action films
1995 directorial debut films
1995 films
Films scored by Vidyasagar
Indian action films
Indian courtroom films